is a traditional Cuban dish served both in homes and in restaurants. It is the Cuban version of rice and beans, a dish found throughout Latin America(except Brazil), the Caribbean, and in the Southern United States.

Etymology

Preparation
To this sofrito are added the white rice and pre-boiled black beans, as well as the water that the beans were boiled in. Other seasonings such as oregano and bay leaf are often added to the dish to give additional flavor.

 are different from simple  in that the beans and rice are cooked in the same pot instead of separately.  is another term for the dish, but is used more commonly to refer to the similar dish with red beans that is traditionally eaten on the eastern part of the island.

See also
 Cuban cuisine
 
 List of legume dishes
  — the equivalent in Venezuela
 Rice and beans

References 

Legume dishes
Latin American rice dishes
Cuban cuisine
National dishes